Zhang Mengying (born 22 December 1993) is a Chinese ice hockey player and member of the Chinese national ice hockey team. She currently serves as an alternate captain to the KRS Vanke Rays in the Zhenskaya Hockey League (ZhHL).

A two time Olympian, Zhang represented China in the women's ice hockey tournament at the 2010 Winter Olympics in Vancouver, where she was the youngest player on the Chinese roster, and in the women's ice hockey tournament at the 2022 Winter Olympics in Beijing. She is a two-time Asian Winter Games medalist, having won bronze at the 2011 Asian Winter Games and silver at the 2017 Asian Winter Games, and was a gold medalist at the 2014 IIHF Women's Challenge Cup of Asia. As a member of the national team, she has also participated in eight IIHF Women's World Championships at the Division I and Division I B levels, and in the women's ice hockey tournaments at the Universiades in 2015 and 2017.

References

External links
 
 

1993 births
Living people
Sportspeople from Qiqihar
Chinese women's ice hockey forwards
Shenzhen KRS Vanke Rays players
Ice hockey players at the 2010 Winter Olympics
Ice hockey players at the 2022 Winter Olympics
Olympic ice hockey players of China
Asian Games medalists in ice hockey
Ice hockey players at the 2011 Asian Winter Games
Ice hockey players at the 2017 Asian Winter Games
Medalists at the 2011 Asian Winter Games
Medalists at the 2017 Asian Winter Games
Asian Games silver medalists for China
Asian Games bronze medalists for China
Competitors at the 2015 Winter Universiade
Competitors at the 2017 Winter Universiade